The Gerzeh culture, also called Naqada II, refers to the archaeological stage at Gerzeh (also Girza or Jirzah), a prehistoric Egyptian cemetery located along the west bank of the Nile. The necropolis is named after el-Girzeh, the nearby contemporary town in Egypt. Gerzeh is situated only several miles due east of the oasis of Faiyum.

The Gerzeh culture is a material culture identified by archaeologists. It is the second of three phases of the prehistoric Naqada cultures and so is also known as Naqada II. The Gerzeh culture was preceded by the Amratian culture ("Naqada I") and followed by the Naqada III ("protodynastic" or "Semainian culture").

Historical context
Sources differ on dating, some saying use of the culture distinguishes itself from the Amratian and begins circa 3500 BC lasting through circa 3200 BC. Accordingly, some authorities place the onset of the Gerzeh coincident with the Amratian or Badari cultures, i.e. c.3800 BC to 3650 BC even though some Badarian artifacts, in fact, may date earlier. Nevertheless, because the Naqada sites were first divided by the British Egyptologist Flinders Petrie in 1894, into Amratian (after the cemetery near el-Amrah) and "Gerzean" (after the cemetery near Gerzeh) sub-periods, the original convention is used in this text.

The Gerzeh culture lasted through a period of time when the desertification of the Sahara had nearly reached its state seen during the late twentieth century.

The primary distinguishing feature between the earlier Amratian and the Gerzeh is the extra decorative effort exhibited in the pottery of the period. Artwork on Gerzeh ceramics features stylised animals and environment to a greater degree than the earlier Amratian artwork. Further, images of ostriches on the pottery artwork possibly indicate an inclination these early peoples may have felt to explore the Sahara desert.

Reed boats
Pictures of ceremonial reed boats appear on some Naqada II jars, showing two male and two female figures standing aboard, the boat being equipped with oars and two cabins.

Contacts with Western and Central Asia

Distinctly foreign objects and art forms entered Egypt during this period, indicating contacts with several parts of Asia. Scientific analysis of ancient wine jars in Abydos has shown that there was some high-volume wine trade with the Levant during this period. Objects such as the Gebel el-Arak knife handle, which has patently Mesopotamian relief carvings on it, have been found in Egypt, and the silver which appears in this period can only have been obtained from Asia Minor.

Lapis lazuli trade, in the form of beads, from its only known prehistoric source – Badakhshan in northeastern Afghanistan – also reached ancient Gerzeh. Other discovered grave goods are on display here.

Cylinder seals
It is generally thought that cylinder seals were introduced from Mesopotamia to Egypt during the Naqada II period. Cylinder seals, some coming from Mesopotamia and Elam, and some made locally in Egypt following Mesopotamian designs in a stylized manner, have been discovered in the tombs of Upper Egypt dating to Naqada II and III, particularly in Hierakonpolis. Mesopotamia cylinder seals have been found in the Gerzean context of Naqada II, in Naqada and Hiw, attesting to the expansion of the Jemdet Nasr culture as far as Egypt at the end of the 4th millennium BC. 

In Egypt, cylinder seals suddenly appear without local antecedents from around Naqada II c-d (3500-3300 BC). The designs are similar to those of Mesopotamia, where they were invented during the early 4th millennium BC, during the Uruk period, as an evolutionary step from various accounting systems and seals going back as early as the 7th millennium BC. The earliest Egyptian cylinder seals are clearly similar to contemporary Uruk seals down to Naqada II-d (circa 3300 BC), and may even have been manufactured by Mesopotamian craftsman, but they start to diverge from circa 3300 BC to become more Egyptian in character. Cylinder seals were made in Egypt as late as the Second Intermediate Period, but they were essentially replaced by scarabs from the time of the Middle Kingdom.

Burials
Burial sites in Gerzeh have uncovered artifacts, such as cosmetic palettes, a bone harpoon, an ivory pot, stone vessels, and several meteoritic iron beads, Technologies at Gerzeh also include fine ripple-flaked knives of exceptional workmanship. The meteoritic iron beads, discovered in two Gerzean graves by Egyptologist Wainwright in 1911, are the earliest artifacts of iron known,  dating to around 3200 BC (see also Iron Age).

One burial uncovered evidence of decapitation.

Oldest known Egyptian painted tomb

Discoveries at Nekhen include Tomb 100, the oldest known tomb with a mural painted on its plaster walls. The sepulchre is thought to date to the Gerzeh culture (c. 3500-3200 BC).

It is presumed that the mural shows religious scenes and images. It includes figures featured in Egyptian culture for three thousand years—a funerary procession of barques, presumably a goddess standing between two upright lionesses, a wheel of various horned quadrupeds, several examples of a staff that became associated with the deity of the earliest cattle culture and one being held up by a heavy-breasted goddess. Animals depicted include onagers or zebras, ibexes, ostriches, lionesses, impalas, gazelles, and cattle.

Several of the images in the mural resemble images seen in the Gebel el-Arak Knife: a figure between two lions, warriors, or boats, but are not stylistically similar.

Proto-hieroglyphic symbols

Some symbols on Gerzeh pottery resemble traditional Egyptian hieroglyphs, which were contemporaneous with the proto-cuneiform script of Sumer. The figurine of a woman is a distinctive design considered characteristic of the culture.

The end of the Gerzeh culture is generally regarded as coinciding with the unification of Egypt, the Naqada III period.

Other artifacts

See also 

Riqqeh

Notes

Bibliography
Petrie/Wainwright/Mackay: The Labyrinth, Gerzeh and Mazghuneh, British School of Archaeology in Egypt XXI. London 1912
Alice Stevenson: Gerzeh, a cemetery shortly before History (Egyptian sites series),London 2006,

External links
Gerzeh (Girza). University College London, 2000
Egypt, ancient. Encyclopædia Britannica, 2005
Gerzeh Tomb 20
Gerzeh Tomb 105
Gerzeh Tomb 205

 
4th-millennium BC establishments
4th-millennium BC disestablishments
4th millennium BC in Egypt
Archaeological cultures in Egypt
Predynastic Egypt
Jemdet Nasr period